The red kite (Milvus milvus) is a medium-large bird of prey in the family Accipitridae, which also includes many other diurnal raptors such as eagles, buzzards, and harriers. The species currently breeds in the Western Palearctic region of Europe and northwest Africa, though it formerly also occurred in northern Iran. It is resident in the milder parts of its range in western Europe and northwest Africa, but birds from northeastern and Central Europe winter further south and west, reaching south to Turkey. Vagrants have reached north to Finland and south to Israel, Libya and Gambia.

Taxonomy
The red kite was described by the Swedish naturalist Carl Linnaeus in 1758 in the 10th edition of his Systema Naturae under the binomial name Falco milvus. The word milvus was the Latin name for the bird. In 1799 the French naturalist Bernard Germain de Lacépède moved the species to the genus Milvus creating the tautonym.

Two subspecies are recognised:
 M. m. milvus (Linnaeus, 1758) – Europe and northwest Africa to the Middle East
 M. m. fasciicauda Hartert, 1914 – Cape Verde Islands

The subspecies M. m. fasciicauda is almost certainly extinct.

The genus Milvus contains two other species: the black kite (M. migrans) and the yellow-billed kite (M. aegyptius). The red kite has been known to successfully hybridize with the black kite in captivity where both species were kept together, and in the wild on the Cape Verde Islands and infrequently in other places. The red kites on the Cape Verde Islands are (or rather were) quite distinct in morphology, being somewhat intermediate with black kites. The question whether the Cape Verde kite should be considered a distinct species (Milvus fasciicauda) or a red kite subspecies has not been settled. A mitochondrial DNA study on museum specimens suggested that Cape Verde birds did not form a monophyletic lineage among or next to red kites. This interpretation is problematic: mtDNA analysis is susceptible to hybridization events, the evolutionary history of the Cape Verde population is not known, and the genetic relationship of red kites is confusing, with geographical proximity being no indicator of genetic relatedness and the overall genetic similarity high, perhaps indicating a relict species. Given the morphological distinctness of the Cape Verde birds and that the Cape Verde population was isolated from other populations of red kites, it cannot be conclusively resolved as to whether the Cape Verde population was not a distinct subspecies (as M. migrans fasciicauda) or even species that frequently absorbed stragglers from the migrating European populations into its gene pool. The Cape Verde population became effectively extinct since 2000, all surviving birds being hybrids with black kites.

The English word "kite" is from the Old English cyta which is of unknown origin. A kite is mentioned by Geoffrey Chaucer's in his Knight's Tale. The early fifteenth century Hengwrt manuscript contains the lines: "Ther cam a kyte, whil þt they were so wrothe That bar awey the boon bitwix hem bothe." The first recorded use of the word "kite" for a toy that is attached to a length of string and flown in the air dates from the seventeenth century.

Description

It is an elegant bird, soaring on long wings held at a dihedral, and long forked tail, twisting as it changes direction. The body, upper tail and wing coverts are rufous. The white primary flight feathers contrast with the black wing tips and dark secondaries. Apart from the weight difference, the sexes are similar, but juveniles have a buff breast and belly. Its call is a thin piping sound, similar to but less mewling than the common buzzard. There is a rare white leucistic form accounting for approximately 1% of hatchlings in the Welsh population, but this variation confers a disadvantage in the survival stakes.

Differences between adults and juveniles
Adults differ from juveniles in a number of characteristics:
 Adults are overall more deeply rufous, compared with the more washed out colour of juveniles;
 Adults have black breast-streaks whereas on juveniles these are pale;
 Juveniles have a less deeply forked tail, with a dark subterminal band;
 Juveniles have pale tips to all of the greater-coverts (secondary and primary) on both the upper- and under-wings, forming a long narrow pale line; adults have pale fringes to upperwing secondary-coverts only.
These differences hold throughout most of the first year of a bird's life.

Behaviour

Breeding

Usually red kites first breed when they are two years old, although exceptionally they can successfully breed when they are only one year old. They are monogamous and the pair-bond in  populations is probably maintained during the winter, particularly when the pair remain on their breeding territory. For migrant populations the fidelity to a particular nesting site means that the pair-bond is likely to be renewed each breeding season. A pair will sometimes use a nest from the previous year and can occasionally occupy an old nest of the common buzzard. The nest is built by both sexes. The male brings dead twigs  in length which are placed by the female. The nest is lined with grass and sometimes also with sheep's wool. Unlike the black kite, no greenery is added to the nest. Both sexes continue to add material to the nest during the incubation and nestling periods. Nests vary greatly in size and can become large when the same nest is occupied for several seasons.

The eggs are laid at three-day intervals. The clutch is usually between one and three eggs but four and even five eggs have occasionally been recorded. The eggs are non-glossy with a white ground and red-brown spots. In Britain and central Europe, laying begins at the end of March but in the Mediterranean area laying begins in early March. The eggs are mainly incubated by the female, but the male will relieve her for short periods while she feeds. The male will also bring food for the female. Incubation starts as soon as the first egg is laid. Each egg hatches after 31 to 32 days but as they hatch asynchronously a clutch of three eggs requires 38 days of incubation. The chicks are cared for by both parents. The female  them for the first 14 days while the male brings food to the nest which the female feeds to the chicks. Later both parents bring items of food which are placed in the nest to allow the chicks to feed themselves. The nestlings begin climbing onto branches around their nest from 45 days but they rarely  before 48–50 days and sometimes not until they are 60–70 days of age. The young spend a further 15–20 days in the neighbourhood of the nest being fed by their parents. Only a single brood is raised each year but if the eggs are lost the female will relay.

The maximum age recorded is 25 years and 8 months for a ringed bird in Germany. The longevity record for Britain and Ireland is 23 years and 10 months for a bird found dead in Wales in 2012.

Food and feeding

The red kite's diet consists mainly of small mammals such as mice, voles, shrews, young hares and rabbits. It feeds on a wide variety of carrion including sheep carcasses and dead game birds. Live birds are also taken and occasionally reptiles and amphibians. Earthworms form an important part of the diet, especially in spring. In some parts of the United Kingdom, red kites are also deliberately fed in domestic gardens, explaining the presence of red kites in urban areas. Here, up to 5% of householders have provided supplementary food for red kites, with chicken the predominant meat provided.

As scavengers, red kites are particularly susceptible to poisoning. Illegal poison baits set for foxes or crows are indiscriminate and kill protected birds and other animals. There have also been a number of incidents of red kites and other raptors being targeted by wildlife criminals.

In the United Kingdom, there have been several unusual instances of red kites stealing food from people in a similar manner to gulls. One such occurrence took place in Marlow, Buckinghamshire (a town near a major reintroduction site for the species in the UK in the nearby village of Stokenchurch), in which Red Kites swooped down to steal sandwiches from people in one of the town's parks.

Distribution and status

They are native to the western Palearctic, with the European population of 19,000–25,000 pairs encompassing 95% of its global breeding range. It breeds from Spain and Portugal east into central Europe and Ukraine, north to southern Sweden, Latvia and the UK, and south to southern Italy. There is a population in northern Morocco. Northern birds move south in winter, mostly staying in the west of the breeding range, but also to eastern Turkey, northern Tunisia and Algeria. The three largest populations (in Germany, France and Spain, which together hold more than 75% of the global population) declined between 1990 and 2000, and overall the species declined by almost 20% over the ten years. The main threats to red kites are poisoning, through illegal direct poisoning and indirect poisoning from pesticides, particularly in the wintering ranges in France and Spain, and changes in agricultural practices causing a reduction in food resources. Other threats include electrocution, hunting and trapping, deforestation, egg-collection (on a local scale) and possibly competition with the generally more successful black kite M. migrans.

Continental Europe

German populations declined by 25%–30% between 1991 and 1997, but have remained stable since. The populations of the northern foothills of the Harz Mountains (the most densely populated part of its range) suffered an estimated 50% decline from 1991 to 2001. In Spain, the species showed an overall decline in breeding population of up to 43% for the period 1994 to 2001–02, and surveys of wintering birds in 2003–04 suggest a similarly large decline in core wintering areas. The Balearic Islands population has declined from 41 to 47 breeding pairs in 1993 to just 10 in 2003. In France, breeding populations have decreased in the northeast, but seem to be stable in southwest and central France and Corsica. Populations elsewhere are stable or undergoing increases. In Sweden, the species has increased from 30 to 50 pairs in the 1970s to 1,200 breeding pairs in 2003. In Switzerland, populations increased during the 1990s, and have stabilised. Red kites are decreasing in their strongholds of Spain, France and Germany, but are increasing in parts of northern Europe, such as Denmark, Sweden and the United Kingdom.

United Kingdom

In the United Kingdom, red kites were ubiquitous scavengers that lived on carrion and rubbish. Shakespeare's King Lear describes his daughter Goneril as a detested kite, and he wrote "when the kite builds, look to your lesser linen" in reference to them stealing washing hung out to dry in the nesting season. In the mid-15th century, King James II of Scotland decreed that they should be "killed wherever possible", but they remained protected in England and Wales for the next 100 years as they kept the streets free of carrion and rotting food. Under Tudor "vermin laws" many creatures were seen as competitors for the produce of the countryside and bounties were paid by the parish for their carcasses.

By the 20th century, the breeding population was restricted to a handful of pairs in South Wales, but recently the Welsh population has been supplemented by re-introductions in England and Scotland. In 2004, from 375 occupied territories identified, at least 216 pairs were thought to have hatched eggs and 200 pairs reared at least 286 young. In 1989, six Swedish birds were released at a site in north Scotland and four Swedish and one Welsh bird in Buckinghamshire. Altogether, 93 birds of Swedish and Spanish origin were released at each of the sites. In the second stage of reintroduction in 1995 and 1996, further birds were brought from Germany to populate areas of Dumfries and Galloway. Between 2004 and 2006, 94 birds were brought from the Chilterns and introduced into the Derwent Valley in north East England. In Northern Ireland, 80 birds from wild stock in Wales were released between 2008 and 2010, and the first successful breeding was recorded in 2010. The reintroductions in the Chilterns Area of Outstanding Natural Beauty have been a success. Between 1989 and 1993, 90 birds were released there and by 2002, 139 pairs were breeding. They can commonly be seen taking advantage of thermals from the M40 motorway. Another successful reintroduction has been in Northamptonshire, which has become a stronghold for the red kite. Thirty Spanish birds were introduced into Rockingham Forest near Corby in 2000, and by 2010, the RSPB estimated that over 200 chicks had been reared from the initial release. So successful has the reintroduction been that 30 chicks have been transported from Rockingham Forest for release in Cumbria. From the Chilterns they have spread as far east as Essex and can be seen over Harlow.  To the west they have recently (2021) spread along the M4 as far as the Cotswold Edge overlooking the Severn near Bristol.

A sighting of the first red kite in London for 150 years was reported in The Independent newspaper in January 2006 and in June of that year, the UK-based Northern Kites Project reported that kites had bred in the Derwent Valley in and around Rowlands Gill, Tyne and Wear for the first time since the re-introduction.

In 1999, the red kite was named 'Bird of the Century' by the British Trust for Ornithology. According to the Welsh Kite Trust, it has been voted "Wales's favourite bird".

In June 2010, the Forestry Commission North West England announced a three-year project to release 90 red kites in Grizedale Forest, Cumbria under a special licence issued by Natural England. The Grizedale programme was the ninth reintroduction of red kites into different regions of the UK and the final re-introduction phase in England.

The stated aims of the Grizedale project were:
 To establish a viable population of red kites in Grizedale, South Cumbria by 2015.
 To increase the rate of red kite expansion into North West England and link up with existing populations in Wales, Yorkshire, North East England and South West Scotland and so increase the chances of a continuous geographical range.
 To develop community involvement and create educational opportunities arising from the project.

As of July 2011, non-breeding birds are regularly seen in all parts of Britain, and the number of breeding pairs is too large for the RSPB to continue to survey them on an annual basis.

Ireland
Red kites were extinct in Ireland by the middle nineteenth century, due to persecution, poisoning and woodland clearance. In May 2007, Minister for the Environment, Heritage and Local Government Dick Roche announced an agreement to bring at least 100 birds from Wales to restock the population as part of a 5-year programme in the Wicklow Mountains, similar to the earlier golden eagle reintroduction programme. On 19 July 2007, the first thirty red kites were released in County Wicklow. On 22 May 2010, 2 newly hatched red kite chicks were discovered in the Wicklow mountains, bringing the number of chicks hatched since reintroduction to 7.

Sweden
Sweden is one location where the red kite seems to be increasing, with around 2,000 pairs in 2009, some of which are overwintering and some flying south to the Mediterranean for the winter. They return around March–April. The red kite is the landscape bird of Scania, and the coat of arms of the municipality of Tomelilla. The kite is often seen along the roadsides and roaming the open colourful wheat and rapeseed fields of Scania.

Populations and trends by country

The following figures (mostly estimates) have been collated from various sources. They cover most of the countries in which red kites are believed to have bred.

Observation

One of the best places to see the red kite in Scandinavia is Scania in southern Sweden. It may be observed in one of its breeding locations such as the Kullaberg Nature Preserve near Mölle. In Switzerland, they are a common sight in all rural areas, excluding the Alps and its foothills.

Some of the best places to see them in the United Kingdom are Gigrin Farm near Rhayader, mid Wales, where hundreds are fed by the local farmer as a tourist attraction, a Red Kite Feeding Station at Llanddeusant in the Brecon Beacons, visited daily by over 50 birds, and the Bwlch Nant yr Arian forest visitor centre in Ceredigion where the rare leucistic variant can be seen. In the UK, the Oxfordshire part of the Chilterns has many red kites, especially near Henley-on-Thames and Watlington, where they were introduced on John Paul Getty's estate. Red Kites are also becoming common in Buckinghamshire, often being seen near Stokenchurch, where a population was released in the 1990s, and Flackwell Heath near High Wycombe. They can also be seen around Harewood near Leeds where they were re-introduced in 1999. In Ireland they can be best observed at Redcross, near Avoca, County Wicklow.

See also
 Shite-hawk
 Beheading the Kite

References

Sources

Further reading

External links

 Friends of Red Kites - Details about the reintroduced kites in the Derwent Valley, Gateshead
 
 BBC Wales Nature - Red Kite footage
 BBC Report about this bird's redemption in UK culture from a hated shithawk to a beloved bird
 The Welsh Kite Trust - includes UK breeding reports
 About Red Kites - includes latest figures available in UK
 Details Red Kites in the Chilterns - about the reintroduced kites in the Chilterns
 Red Kites in Yorkshire
 Red Kites in Berkshire (Berkshire Ornithological Club) - 2006/2007 Survey
 Adult and juvenile Red Kite wing identification images (PDF; 5.6 MB) by Javier Blasco-Zumeta & Gerd-Michael Heinze
 
 
 

red kite
Falconry
red kite
Birds described in 1758
Birds of prey of Africa
Birds of Cape Verde
Birds of prey of Europe
red kite